Thur is a  river in north-eastern Switzerland. Its source is near the mountain Säntis in the south-east of the canton of St. Gallen. In this canton it flows through the Toggenburg region and the town of Wil, SG. After Wil, the Thur flows through the canton of Thurgau, named after the river, and its capital Frauenfeld. The final  of the Thur are in the canton of Zürich. It then flows into the river Rhine on the border with Germany, south of Schaffhausen.

Rivers of Switzerland
Rivers of the canton of St. Gallen